Muthukulam is backwater village near Haripad in Alappuzha district in the Indian state of Kerala.

Demographics 
 India Census, Muthukulam had a population of 20,740 with 9,474 males and 11,266 females. Population of Children with age of 0-6 is 1719 which is 8.29% of total population of Muthukulam. In Muthukulam, Female Sex Ratio is 1189 against state average of 1084. Moreover, Child Sex Ratio in Muthukulam is around 852 compared to Kerala state average of 964. Literacy rate of Muthukulam is 95.73% higher than state average of 94.00%. In Muthukulam, Male literacy is around 97.48% while female literacy rate is 94.29%.

Out of total population, 6,505 were engaged in work related to Primary sector or business activity. Of this 4,242 were males while 2,263 were females. Of total 6505 working population, 72.85% were engaged in Main Work while 27.15% of total workers were engaged in Marginal Work.

Muthukulam has total administration over 5,692 houses to which it supplies basic amenities like water, electricity and sewerage. It is also authorised to build roads within its limits and impose taxes on properties coming under its jurisdiction.

Geography
Muthukulam is a small backwater village in Central Kerala. It is bordered by the Kanyakumari-Panvel National Highway 66 on the east and the backwaters to the west. A narrow strip of land comprising Aratupuzha village beyond the backwaters separates Muthukulam from the Arabian sea in the West. The nearest major town is Haripad which is well connected by Haripad-Muthukulam-Kayamkulam road. The nearest railway station are Haripad(HAD) and Kayamkulam(KYJ).

Landmarks

The Rajiv Gandhi Combined Cycle Power Plant, RGCCPP (aka National Thermal Power Corporation), the first thermal power plant in Kerala, is situated at Choolatheruvu in Muthukulam.

Pandavarkaavu Temple which is one of the oldest and important temples in the erstwhile Travancore is the major attraction of Muthukulam. The temple which is believed to have been installed by Kunti Devi, Mother of the Pandavas, has goddess Durga as the presiding deity. According to legend, each Pandavas had installed an idol of Lord Vishnu in the five places on the banks of the River Pampa and their mother installed Durga at Muthukulam. They developed an idol with clay and offered it 'Kadalipazham' a variety of banana. Still 'Kadalipazham' serving to goddess is practiced by devotees.  The shrines installed by pandavas dedicated to Lord Vishnu at Thrichitat, Thiruppuliyoor, Thiruvaranmula, Thiruvanvandoor and Thrikkodithanam, located in central Kerala districts, are collectively called ‘Pandava Temples’ of the state. According to legend, the idol of Thrichittat temple was installed by the eldest Pandava Yuddhishtra, Tiruppuliyoor by Bheema, Thiruvaranmula by Arjuna and the idols of Tiruvanvandoor and Thrikkodithanam temples respectively by youngest ones Nakula and Sahadeva.

Travancore Devaswom Board (TDB) is drawing up an ambitious pilgrim tourism circuit programme connecting the ‘Pandava temples’ under the Centre’s ‘Swadesh Darshan’ scheme, which is meant for theme-based development of destinations.

Politics
Muthukulam is part of Haripad Assembly Constituency.Ramesh Chennithala of Indian National Congress is the Current Member of legislative Assembly. 

Muthukulam is the headquarters of the Muthukulam Block Panchayath, comprising villages of Muthukulam, Chingoli, Arattupuzha, Cheppad, Kandalloor, Pathiyoor, Krishnapuram and Devikulangara. 

Muthukulam is a place where the two alliances, UDF and LDF, have comparable power. After the 2020 Local Government Polls, CPIM led LDF is ruling the panchayat with a support of two independent members. 

Indian National Congress is the single largest party in the Panchayat with 5 ward members. CPI(M) and BJP has 4 members each.

Muthukulam Block Panchayath is ruled by CPIM led LDF with a huge majority.

Attractions 
Ancestral house of Padmarajan
Paandavar Kaavu Devi Temple
Karunamuttom Shiva Temple
Erayill Devi Temple
Maayikkal Devi Temple
Kalpakasseril temple 
Kollakayil Devi Temple
Elankam Devi Temple
St. George Orthodox Church
St. Thomas Marthoma Church Muthukulam
Kurumbakara Devi Temple
Vettikulangara Devi Temple.
Muthukulam St. George Orthodox Church
Kanakakkunnu Jetty
Vettathukadavu

Notable people
Muthukulam Raghavan Pillai: Known as the Akshara Guru of Malayalam talkie films, he wrote the screenplay and dialogues of Balan, the first Malayalam talkie and Jeevithanauka, first box office hit in Malayalam film industry.
Padmarajan: Director and the founder of a new school of film making in Malayalam.
Muthukulam Parvathy Amma

References 

 http://www.census2011.co.in/data/town/628263-muthukulam-kerala.html

Villages in Alappuzha district